USS Osmond Ingram (DD-255/AVD–9/APD-35) was a  in the United States Navy during World War II. She was named for Gunners Mate First Class Osmond Ingram, who posthumously received the Medal of Honor.

Construction and commissioning
Osmond Ingram was laid down 15 October 1918 by Bethlehem Shipbuilding Corporation's Fore River Shipyard in Quincy, Massachusetts; launched 23 February 1919; sponsored by Mrs. N. E. Ingram, mother of Osmond Ingram; and commissioned at Boston 28 June 1919. She was designated AVD–9 from 2 August 1940 until 4 November 1943; reverted to DD–255 until 22 June 1944; and completed her service as APD–35.

History
After several years’ Atlantic service in fleet operations, Osmond Ingram decommissioned 24 June 1922 and went into reserve at Philadelphia. Converted to seaplane tender, she recommissioned 22 November 1940 and sailed for San Juan, Puerto Rico, her home port from 15 January 1941. She tended patrol planes through the area bounded by Trinidad, Antigua, and San Juan, then sailed to base in the Panama Canal Zone tending patrol craft at Salinas, Ecuador, and in the Galápagos Islands through June 1942.

Osmond Ingram sank her first submarine, with gunfire 13 December 1943 after she had been forced to surface by depth charge attacks. This and similar outstanding performance of duty by her sisters brought the group a Presidential Unit Citation (US).

After a convoy to Gibraltar early in 1944, Osmond Ingram served on escort duty between New York and Trinidad until June, when she entered Charleston Navy Yard for conversion to a high speed transport. She joined amphibious forces in the Mediterranean in time for the pre-invasion assaults on islands off the French coast 14 August 1944, then escorted convoys along the French and Italian coasts until returning Norfolk, Virginia late in December.

Now assigned to the Pacific, Osmond Ingram continued her war service with escort duty en route New York via Panama to San Diego, Pearl Harbor, Eniwetok, and Ulithi. She sailed 2 April 1945 with an assault force for Okinawa, and until that island was secured, alternately escorted fast convoys to Saipan and Guam and patrolled the seaward defense lines for Hagushi Anchorage. During July, she escorted ships between Leyte and Hollandia, New Guinea; in August, began patrols through the Philippines and to Borneo. After the end of the war she aided in the occupation of Japan, calling at Wakayama, Kure, and Nagoya until sailing for home.

Fate
Osmond Ingram decommissioned at Philadelphia 8 January 1946, was struck from the Navy List 21 January 1946, and was sold for scrapping to Hugo Neu 17 June 1946.

Osmond Ingram received 6 battle stars and the Presidential Unit Citation for World War II service.

References

External links
 http://www.navsource.org/archives/05/255.htm

 

Clemson-class destroyers
World War II destroyers of the United States
World War II auxiliary ships of the United States
Seaplane tenders of the United States Navy
World War II amphibious warfare vessels of the United States
Ships built in Quincy, Massachusetts
1919 ships